2009 ANFA Cup, marketed as Prime Minister's Invitational Tournament, the thirteenth version of the ANFA Cup, a knock-out football tournament organized by the All Nepal Football Association. All matches were played at the Dasarath Rangasala Stadium in Kathmandu. Six teams participated in the tournament.

Teams

  Nepal Red
  Nepal Blue
 
 
 Arambagh KS
 JW GROUP

Group stage

Group A

Group B

Bracket

Matches

Semi-finals

Final

Notes

See also
ANFA Cup

References 

ANFA Cup
2009 in Nepalese sport
2009–10 in Nepalese football